Albany Carnegie Library may refer to:

Carnegie Library of Albany (Albany, Georgia)
Carnegie Library of Albany (Albany, Missouri)
Carnegia Library of Albany (Albany, Oregon) (List of Carnegie libraries in Oregon)